Robert Thomas Dail (born January 14, 1953) is a retired United States Army lieutenant general.

He was born in Norfolk, Virginia.

References

1953 births
Living people
People from Norfolk, Virginia
University of Richmond alumni
Boston University alumni
United States Army Command and General Staff College alumni
National Defense University alumni
Recipients of the Legion of Merit
United States Army generals
Recipients of the Distinguished Service Medal (US Army)
Recipients of the Defense Distinguished Service Medal